Temnopis is a genus of beetles in the family Cerambycidae, containing the following species:

 Temnopis castanea Martins, 1978
 Temnopis fasciata Galileo & Martins, 2003
 Temnopis forticornis (Tippmann, 1960)
 Temnopis fuscipennis Martins, 1978
 Temnopis jolyi Martins, 1978
 Temnopis latifascia Martins & Monné, 1975
 Temnopis martinezi Martins, 1985
 Temnopis megacephala (Germar, 1824)
 Temnopis nigripes Aurivillius, 1893
 Temnopis oculata Zajciw, 1960
 Temnopis rubricollis Martins, Galileo & de-Oliveira, 2009

References

Xystrocerini